The Dr. Vishnuvardhan Award, instituted in 2011 for the 2008–09 Karnataka State Film Awards is an award given by the government of Karnataka to long-serving film personalities in Kannada cinema. The award previously called Lifetime Contribution to Kannada Cinema Award, was named Dr. Vishnuvardhan Award in honour of Vishnuvardhan, one of Kannada cinema's actors, after his demise in 2009. The award carries a purse of 200,000 and a gold-plated plaque.

Recipients

See also
 Karnataka State Film Awards

References

Karnataka State Film Awards
2011 establishments in Karnataka